Vilice is a municipality and village in Tábor District in the South Bohemian Region of the Czech Republic. It has about 100 inhabitants.

Administrative parts
The village of Hrnčíře is an administrative part of Vilice.

Gallery

References

Villages in Tábor District